Dwight may refer to:

People
 Dwight (given name)
 Dwight D. Eisenhower (1890–1969), 34th president of the United States and former military officer
New England Dwight family of American educators, military and political leaders, and authors
 Ed Dwight (born 1933), American test pilot, participated in astronaut training program
 Mabel Dwight (1875–1955), American artist
 Elton John (born Reginald Dwight in 1947), English singer, songwriter and musician

Places

Canada
 Dwight, Ontario, village in the township of Lake of Bays, Ontario

United States
 Dwight (neighborhood), part of an historic district in New Haven, Connecticut
 Dwight, Illinois, village in Livingston and Grundy counties
 Dwight, Kansas, city in Morris County
 Dwight, Massachusetts, village in Hampshire County
 Dwight, Michigan, an unincorporated community
 Dwight, Nebraska, village in Butler County
 Dwight, North Dakota, city in Richland County
 Dwight Township, Livingston County, Illinois
 Dwight Township, Michigan

Institutions
 Dwight Correctional Center, maximum security prison for adult females in Illinois
 Dwight School, New York City